Clonea Castle was in Clonea parish in the historical barony of Decies-without-Drum in south County Waterford, Ireland. Located in Clonea Lower townland, roughly two and a half miles east of Dungarvan, the castle lay on a rocky outcrop at the edge of the shore by Clonea Beach. It was owned by the Maguire (McGuire) family.

The structure's entry in National Monuments Service records indicate that it was "not an antiquity", but was built in the late 18th or early 19th century, possibly on the site of an earlier Fitzgerald family fortification. While some of the structure remained into the late 20th century, the remaining ruins were largely destroyed by a winter storm in 1990.

Journalist and politician Muriel Bowen (1926–2000) was born on the Clonea Castle estate.

References

Castles in County Waterford
Former castles in the Republic of Ireland